Dale Bandy is former American basketball player and an American coach. Playing for coach Jim Snyder at Ohio University, he was team captain of the 1960 team that made the Sweet Sixteen in the 1960 NCAA tournament. He was an assistant under Snyder, who led his teams to 7 NCAA tournament appearances (1960, 1961, 1964, 1965, 1970, 1972, and 1974) and one National Invitation Tournament appearance (1969). He succeeded Snyder as head coach of the Ohio Bobcats men's basketball team from the 1974–75 season to the 1979–80 season (six years). Coach Bandy's teams compiled a 69–89 record, good for a .436 winning percentage. His Mid-American Conference record was 36–58 (.382).

He was a graduate of Clay High School (Portsmouth, Ohio) where his father was a long-time administrator. While at Ohio he played baseball as well as basketball.

Head coaching record

References

Year of birth missing (living people)
Living people
American men's basketball coaches
American men's basketball players
Basketball coaches from Ohio
Basketball players from Ohio
Ohio Bobcats men's basketball coaches
Ohio Bobcats men's basketball players
Ohio University alumni
People from Portsmouth, Ohio